Union Academy is a K-12 public charter school in Monroe, North Carolina, USA, founded in 2000. In 2017, the school opened a new $4 million wing which became the new elementary school. The previous elementary school building, located at 3828 Old Charlotte Hwy, is now used as a Pre-K and Professional Development Center. 

Union Academy won the Gold Collage Preparedness Medal in 2019 and 2020.

References

External links
 Union Academy Official Site

Schools in Union County, North Carolina
Private schools in North Carolina